International Institute of Information Technology Hyderabad (IIITH, pronounced Triple-Eye-T), formerly Indian Institute of Information Technology, is a higher-education institute deemed-to-be-university, founded as a non profit public private partnership (N-PPP), located in Telangana, India. It is the first IIIT in India under this model.

IIITH is a residential institute spread over 66 acres right in the center of the Gachibowli IT hub. The institute has 101 faculties, and currently have 1896 students and 115 administrative and supporting staffs

History
IIIT Hyderabad was set up in 1998 under the public private partnership model by Ministry of Human Resource Development of the Government of Andhra Pradesh and NASSCOM, with the state government supplying a grant of land and buildings. As special officer for IIIT Hyderabad and Secretary of IT for the state government, Ajay Prakash Sawhney was responsible for shaping the conceptual model and overseeing initial development of the institute. Rajeev Sangal, former director of Indian Institute of Technology (BHU) Varanasi designed the syllabus and served as the first director of the institute until 10 April 2013.

The institution was founded under the name Indian Institute of Information Technology Hyderabad as a foundation for the 20 Indian Institutes of Information Technology under same model, which was later renamed to International Institute of Information Technology Hyderabad in 2001 when it attained a status of Deemed University.

Campus
Government of Andhra Pradesh allotted 66 acres of land to IIIT Hyderabad in 1998 located on the main Gachibowli road, also known as the old Bombay highway. The institute is  surrounded by many academic and research institutions like the University of Hyderabad (UOH), Indian School of Business (ISB), Indian Immunological and Jawaharlal Nehru Institute of Development Banking (JNIDB), Tata Consultancy Services (TCS) and many more. It also lies in proximity to the bustling HiTech City Center and Lingampally railway station.

The institute has 30 research centers. In addition to this, the academic buildings have lecture halls, workspaces, teaching labs, computer and electronics labs and also offices of the administration and faculty. Building complexes are named after the mountain ranges Nilgiri, Vindhya and Himalaya. IIITH also houses Kohli Center on Intelligent Systems (KCIS), a state-of-the-art research center, established in 2015 with funding from Tata Consultancy Services (TCS) foundation to give a fillip to research, teaching and entrepreneurship in the broad area of intelligent systems. The campus also has incubators, research centers, library, auditorium and an amphitheater which hosts multiple cultural events and college festivals. IIITH’s Centre for Innovation and Entrepreneurship also hosts many companies and startups on campus.

Due to its proximity to the Sports Authority of Telangana State (SATS) , Gopichand Badminton Academy and G M C Balayogi Athletic Stadium, the campus has access to various sports facilities. Apart from this, the campus has football, hockey, and cricket grounds, tennis, badminton, basketball, and volleyball courts, as well as indoor and outdoor gyms.

On-campus facilities include a SBI bank and ATM, canteens, clinic, canteens, gym,  laundry services and more.

Student Hostels 
IIITH is a residential institute, and it is compulsory for all students to stay on-campus. First year and second year students who have enrolled in bachelor's or dual-degree programs are required to share rooms (double occupancy) whereas, from the third year onward, students have single occupancy. An optical fiber network connects all campus buildings, including the hostels. IIITH has five hostels - three for boys and two for girls.

 Palash Nivas (Old Boys Hostel) for undergraduate students from second year onwards and first -year postgraduate students. The hostel is attached to the North and South Mess.
 New Boys Hostel (NBH) for postgraduate seniors and research students pursuing M.S or Ph.D. The hostel is attached to Yuktahar mess and non-vegetarian Kadamba Mess.
 Bakul Nivas for undergraduate first year students and second year postgraduate students.
 Old Parijaat Nivas for third and fourth year women students.
 New Parijaat Nivas (New Girls Hostel) for first, second and third year women students.

Accommodation 
The institute provides housing facilities for faculty and staff spread across 100 flats on campus in C & D Block, as well as Anand and Budh Nivas. There’s also a guest house with four air-conditioned suites for visitors to campus.

Administration

Governing Council 
The institute is supervised by a governing council, which is currently headed by Turing Award laureate Raj Reddy. Day-to-day operations are managed by the  Director, P. J. Narayanan who is  assisted by the dean of research and dean of academics.

Director
 P. J. Narayanan (April 2013 to present)
 Rajeev Sangal  (Mar 2002 to April 2013) 
 Narendra Ahuja  (Aug 1999 to Mar 2002)

Academics

Admissions

Admission to undergraduate programs is based on one of five acceptance modes: Joint Entrance Examination (Main) (JEE (Main)), the institute's own Undergraduate Engineering Entrance Examination (UGEE) and interview, representing India in the International Olympiads during class XI and XII (including International Olympiad in Informatics (IOI), International Physics Olympiad (IPhO), International Chemistry Olympiad (IChO), International Biology Olympiad (IBO), International Astronomy Olympiad (IAO), International Mathematical Olympiad (IMO) and International Linguistics Olympiad (IOL) / Paninian Linguistics Olympiad (PLO), Direct Admissions for Students Abroad (DASA) and lateral entry admissions to dual-degree programs through Lateral Entry Entrance Examination (LEEE) and interview.

Admissions for postgraduate studies are on the basis of the Postgraduate Entrance Exam (PGEE) conducted by IIIT Hyderabad. Admissions to the MSIT programme run at this institute are based on a test conducted every year from April to May.

Rankings

It was ranked 78th among universities in India by the National Institutional Ranking Framework (NIRF) in 2020, 43rd among engineering colleges And in the 101–150 band overall.

Notable faculty 
 Narendra Ahuja, founding director (1999–2002), Donald Biggar Willett Professor Emeritus in Engineering at the University of Illinois at Urbana–Champaign.
 P. J. Narayanan, Professor and Director.
 Vishal Garg, founding head, Center for IT in Building Science.

References

External links

 

Educational institutions established in 1998
International Institute of Information Technology, Hyderabad
Research institutes in Hyderabad, India
1998 establishments in Andhra Pradesh